In a physical setting a measurement instrument may be gauged to measuring substances of a specific physical quantity. In such a context the specific physical quantity is called a measured quantity.

The synonymous notion "observable" often is used in the context of quantum mechanics.

Scientific models and ensuing mathematical models of a physical setting permit to calculate expected values of related non-measured physical quantities.

See also

Physical property

Physical quantities
Measurement
Metrology